Ran Kevita 1 (The Golden Rod), is a 2007 Sri Lankan Sinhala children's fantasy film directed by Udayakantha Warnasuriya and co-produced by Pravin Jayarathne, Dilman Jayaratne, Janitha Marasinghe and Udayakantha Warnasuriya for Millennium Entertainment. Its sequel film Ran Kevita 2 directed by the same director released in 2013. It stars Harith Beddewela and Hisham Samsudeen in lead role along with Vijaya Nandasiri and Srinath Maddumage. Music composed by Sangeeth Wickramasinghe. It is the 1084th Sri Lankan film in the Sinhala cinema.

Plot
12-year-old Suran comes from a village. His pen friend Janith lives in town and he visits Suran's rural village during school vacations. Going around the beautiful village Suran and Janith one day visit a friend's home. There they find a loris. Seeing the animal Suran is reminded of a story he had read in a book and the two friends start to dig out the truth of what he had heard. Getting together with a young novice monk in the temple the two friends find books that mention about a supernatural power that can be obtained using the tears of loris. With the help of the monk they prepare the application which could be used to see the guardian devil of bulls. They further realise if they can have access to the golden rod belonging to the devil they would be able to do wonders. Suran and Janith prepare the application and apply it on their eyelids, see the devil and obtain the rod.

Cast
 Harith Baddewela as Suran
 Hisham Samsudeen as Janith
 Srinath Maddumage as Vilba 
 Vijaya Nandasiri as Suran's father
 Semini Iddamalgoda as Janith's mother
 Bennett Rathnayake as Janith's father
 Sarath Chandrasiri as Devil
 Ariyasena Gamage as Card player
 Saman Hemaratne as Dingiya
 Gunawardena Hettiarachchi
 Susantha Chandramali as Suran's mother

Songs 
පැන්සල් පොත් නෑලු - Raminda Dixy

Soundtrack

References

2007 films
2000s Sinhala-language films
Films directed by Udayakantha Warnasuriya